Growing Pains is the fourth album from Json. Lamp Mode Recordings released the project on February 21, 2012.

Reception

Signaling in a four out of five review by Rapzilla, Nyon Smith recognizes, "Maybe Growing Pains would have had a greater impact had the aesthetically darker tracks preluded the more mainstream 'feel good' tracks. Regardless, Growing Pains is still an album that is greater than the sum of its parts." Michael Weaver, indicating for Jesus Freak Hideout in a four star out of five review, realizes, "While there are a couple of songs worthy of the skip button and one noticeably weak track, the remaining good songs are really good. Unashamed, Godly lyrics based in scripture rule Growing Pains, and while it's not the most unique album musically, it's still solid." Signaling in a five star review by New Release Tuesday, Mark Ryan replies, "From top to bottom this album is solid... [and] such a consistent piece of art." In an eight out of ten review by Steve Hayes from Cross Rhythms, responds, "Json brings an honest project, mixing varied instrumentals." Josh Burkey, writing a three star out of five review for Indie Vision Music, reports, "Pain is solid in its deliverance, honest in its lyrics and contains a mixture of beats from young and old hip hop."

Track listing

Charts

References

2012 albums
Json (rapper) albums
Albums produced by Street Symphony